The Democratic Centre of Montenegro (Demokratski centar Crne Gore, DC) was the minor short-lived centrist political party in Montenegro.

History
It was formed in 2009, following the split in the leadership of the Movement for Changes (PzP). Its founder and president was Goran Batričević, former vice-president of the PzP. Party regarded itself as the moral and ideological heir of the original Group for Changes non-governmental organization.

At the 2009 parliamentary election the party participated within a centrist "For a Different Montenegro" coalition with Liberal Party of Montenegro (LP CG), which won only 2,7% of votes, just below the 3% electoral threshold. After the election party activity significantly decreased, but it remained formally active, until its dissolution in 2014.

Parliamentary elections

References

Liberal parties in Montenegro
Pro-European political parties in Montenegro